Acuna or Acuña may refer to:

People with the surname

Alejandro Nogués Acuňa (1907-1989), Argentine chess player
Alex Acuña (born 1944), Peruvian percussionist
Ángela Acuña Braun (1888-1983) first female attorney in Central America (from Costa Rica)
Antonio Osorio de Acuña (1459–1526), Spanish bishop
Carlos Acuña (1914–1999), Argentinian composer and singer
Carlos Javier Acuña (born 1988), Paraguayan football (soccer) player
Clarence Acuña (born 1975), Chilean footballer
Cristóbal Diatristán de Acuña (1597–1676), Spanish missionary and explorer
Diego Sarmiento de Acuña, conde de Gondomar (1567–1626), Spanish diplomat
Fort Acuña, a Filipino basketball player
Francisco Acuña de Figueroa (1791–1862), Uruguayan poet
Francisco Javier González-Acuña, Mexican mathematician, professor, and author
Hernando de Acuña (c. 1520–1580), Spanish poet, soldier and diplomat
Jason Acuña (born 1973), Italian-born American actor
Juan Acuña (1923–2001), Chief Meteorologist for KZTV News in Corpus Christi, Texas
Juan Acuña Naya (1923–2001), Spanish football goalkeeper
Juan de Acuña, marqués de Casafuerte (1658–1734), Spanish military officer and viceroy of New Spain 1722–1734
Julián Acuña Galé (1900–1973), Cuban botanist for whom the standard author abbreviation "Acuna" is used when citing a botanical name
Justicia Acuña (1893-1980), Chilean engineer; first woman with this profession in her country and in South America
Manuel Acuña (1849–1873), Mexican poet and playwright
Manuel Acuña Roxas (1892–1948), President of the Philippines
Marcela Acuña (born 1976), Argentinian boxer
Marcos Acuña (born 1991), Argentinian footballer 
Patrick Acuña (born 1986), American musician, drummer of the indie rock band Silent Old Mtns
Pedro Bravo de Acuña (died 1606), Spanish military officer and colonial official in the New World and the Philippines
Ricardo Acuña (born 1958), Chilean former tennis player
Roberto Acuña (born 1972), Argentinian-born Paraguayan football (soccer) player
Rodolfo Acuña (born 1932), American historian
Ronald Acuña Jr. (born 1997), Venezuelan professional baseball player
Val Acuña, a Filipino basketball player

Places
Ciudad Acuña, Coahuila, Mexico
Acuña (municipality), also in the Mexican state of Coahuila

See also
Vilo Acuña Airport, Cuba
Ing. Alberto Acuña Ongay International Airport, serving Campeche, Mexico